ZQ, Z.Q. or Zq may refer to:

People and characters
 Zainab Qayyum (born 1975; "ZQ"), a Pakistani model, actress, and television host
 ZQ, a fictional character from Dude Bro Party Massacre III

Companies, groups, organizations
 XHZQ-FM, Canduacan, Tabasco, Mexico; a radio station branded as "ZQ"
 Ark Airways (IATA airline code ZQ), a cargo airline of Armenia

Products, brands
 ZQ, the non-US model series numbers for the Sharp Wizard electronic organizer
 LandSpace ZhuQue ("ZQ") series of rockets

Other uses
 Zq, the molecular Hamiltonian charge of a nucleus: atomic number Z * q (electrons' negative elementary charge)
 ZQ, the ITU prefix for the United Kingdom

See also

 ZQGame, Chinese videogame company